Euparyphus is a genus of flies in the family Stratiomyidae.

Species
Euparyphus albipilosus Adams, 1903
Euparyphus apicalis Coquillett, 1902
Euparyphus arizonae James, 1973
Euparyphus ater James, 1973
Euparyphus bistriatus Williston, 1896
Euparyphus brasiliensis Lindner, 1949
Euparyphus brevicornis Loew, 1866
Euparyphus carbonarius Giglio-Tos, 1891
Euparyphus cataractus Quist, 1973
Euparyphus cinctus Osten Sacken, 1886
Euparyphus elegans (Wiedemann, 1830)
Euparyphus elongatulus Williston, 1900
Euparyphus facialis James, 1973
Euparyphus hamifer James, 1940
Euparyphus lagunae Cole, 1912
Euparyphus limbrocutris Adams, 1903
Euparyphus monensis James, 1973
Euparyphus mutabilis Adams, 1903
Euparyphus nebulosus James, 1973
Euparyphus ornatus Williston, 1885
Euparyphus pardalinus James, 1936
Euparyphus patagius Quist, 1973
Euparyphus peruvianus Lindner, 1941
Euparyphus pygmaea James, 1973
Euparyphus rothi James, 1973
Euparyphus sabroskyi James, 1936
Euparyphus stigmaticalis Loew, 1866
Euparyphus tricolor Osten Sacken, 1886
Euparyphus umbrulus Quist, 1973

References

Stratiomyidae
Brachycera genera
Taxa named by Carl Eduard Adolph Gerstaecker
Diptera of South America
Diptera of North America